Scialo Bros. Bakery, simply called Scialo’s, was a Federal Hill, Providence, Rhode Island bakery open from 1916 until owner Carol Scialo Gaeta closed it on March 14, 2020. Her father Luigi and his brother Gaetano had opened the bakery. It was considered Federal Hill’s last authentic Italian bakery.

An anonymous group of investors bought the building, and abiding to agreements made at the time of purchase, opened again in !ay 2021 under the same name, using the same recipes and with Carol working at the bakery.

Television 
In 2012, Andrew Zimmern filmed an episode of Bizarre Foods America there.  They also appeared on the Bobby Flay show Food Nation.  They were recommended by Travel + Leisure.

Honors and awards
Carol’s sister Lois Ellis was honored by the National Organization of Italian American Women in 2012.

References

Bakeries of the United States
Federal Hill, Providence, Rhode Island